Lende is a surname. Notable people with the surname include:

Sijtje van der Lende (born 1950), Dutch speed skater
Torkel Lende (1849–1909), Norwegian inventor

See also
Karen Lende O'Connor (born 1958), American equestrian
Linde (surname)